Ted Reynolds (c. 1925 – April 28, 2009) was a broadcaster on both Canadian television and radio. His career spanned for more than fifty years, with some thirty five having been spent with the CBC.

Career
Ted Reynolds joined the CBC in 1956 and covered numerous sports and events, notably the Olympic Games, Commonwealth Games, Pan American Games and Grey Cup. He provided commentary for 23 sports and 10 Olympiads.

Legacy
Reynolds is a member of the CBC's Sports Hall of Fame, and the only media member so honored in the Canadian Aquatic Hall of Fame.

Family
Reynolds, a native of Grand Forks, British Columbia,
was a West Vancouver resident of many years.

He is survived by his second wife, Joan, of 34 years (his first wife died in the early 1970s), four children, eight grandchildren and four great-grandchildren.

Death
Ted Reynolds died, aged 84, on April 28, 2009 in Vancouver.

References

1920s births
2009 deaths
Canadian television personalities
Canadian Football League announcers
Olympic Games broadcasters
People from the Regional District of Kootenay Boundary
People from West Vancouver
Date of birth missing
Place of birth missing